Tansen ( – 26 April 1589), also referred to and commonly known as Sangeet Samrat or Mian was a Hindustani classical musician. Born in a Hindu Gaur Brahmin family, he learnt and perfected his art in the northwest region of modern Madhya Pradesh. He began his career and spent most of his adult life in the court and patronage of the Hindu king of Rewa, Raja Ramchandra Singh (r.1555–1592), where Tansen's musical abilities and studies gained widespread fame. This reputation brought him to the attention of the Mughal Emperor Akbar, who sent messengers to Raja Ramchandra Singh, requesting Tansen to join the musicians at the Mughal court. Tansen did not want to go, but Raja Ramchandra Singh encouraged him to gain a wider audience, and sent him along with gifts to Akbar. In 1562, about the age of 60, the Vaishnava musician Tansen joined the Akbar's court, and his performances became a subject of many court historians.

Numerous legends have been written about Tansen, mixing facts and fiction, and the historicity of these stories is doubtful. Akbar considered him one of the Navaratnas (the nine jewels), and gave him the title Mian, an honorific, meaning learned man.

Tansen was a composer, musician and vocalist, to whom many compositions have been attributed in northern regions of the Indian subcontinent. He was also an instrumentalist who popularized and improved musical instruments. He is among the most influential personalities in North Indian tradition of Indian classical music, called Hindustani. His 16th-century studies in music and compositions inspired many, and he is considered by numerous North Indian gharana (regional music schools) to be their lineage founder.

Tansen is remembered for his epic Dhrupad compositions, creating several new ragas, as well as for writing two classic books on music Sri Ganesh Stotra and Sangita Sara.

Early life
Tansen's date and place of birth are unclear, but most sources place his birth about 1500 CE, or between 1493 and 1506. His biography is also unclear and many conflicting accounts exist, with some common elements. Historical facts about Tansen are difficult to extract from the extensive and contradictory legends that surround him.

According to the common elements in the various stories, Tansen's name as a child was Ramtanu. His father Mukund Pandey (also known as Mukund Pande or Mukund Ram) was a wealthy poet and accomplished musician, who for some time was a Hindu temple priest in Varanasi.

Tansen learnt and perfected his art in the region around Gwalior, in modern Madhya Pradesh. He began his career and spent most of his adult life in the court and patronage of the Hindu king of Rewa, Raja Ramchandra Singh, where Tansen's musical abilities and studies gained him widespread fame and following. He was a close confidant of Raja Ramchandra Singh, and they used to make music together. Tansen's reputation brought him to the attention of the Mughal Emperor Akbar, who sent messengers to Raja Ramchandra Singh, requesting Tansen to join the musicians at the Mughal court. Tansen initially refused to go, sought to retire instead into solitude, but Raja Ramchandra Singh, encouraged him to gain wider audience, and sent him along with gifts to Akbar. In 1562, about the age of sixty, Tansen still a Vaishnava musician arrived for the first time in Akbar's court.

Tansen's influence was central to create the Hindustani classical ethos as we know today. A number of descendants and disciples trace him to be their lineage founder. Many gharanas (schools) of Hindustani classical music claim some connection to his lineage. To these gharanas, Tansen is the founder of Hindustani classical music.

Schooling

The legendary oral versions about Tansen's early life and schooling particularly differ depending on whether the story has origins in Hindu legends (Vaishnavism) or Muslim legends (Sufism). In Hindu versions, the Hindu bhakti saint and poet-musician Swami Haridas was the major influence on Tansen. In Islamic biographies, the Sufi Muslim mystic named Muhammad Ghaus is said to have influenced Tansen. According to Bonnie Wade – a professor of Music specializing in South Asia Studies, Swami Haridas is widely accepted to have been Tansen's teacher, and it is clear that Tansen connected with Muhammad Ghaus as well, but the evidence suggests that Tansen is less affiliated with either religion, more with music.

Tansen showed musical talent at the age of 6. At some point, he was discipled for some time to Swami Haridas, the legendary composer from Vrindavan and part of the stellar Gwalior court of Raja Man Singh Tomar (1486–1516 AD), specialising in the Dhrupad style of singing. His talent was recognised early and it was the ruler of Gwalior who conferred upon the maestro the honorific title 'Tansen'. Haridas was considered to be a legendary teacher in that time. It is said that Tansen had no equal apart from his teacher. From Haridas, Tansen acquired not only his love for dhrupad but also his interest in compositions in the local language. This was the time when the Bhakti tradition was fomenting a shift from Sanskrit to the local idiom (Brajbhasa and Hindi), and Tansen's compositions also highlight this trend. At some point during his apprenticeship, Tansen's father died, and he returned home, where it is said he used to sing at a local Shiva temple.

Hagiographies mention Tansen met the Sufi mystic Muhammad Ghaus. The interaction with Ghaus brought Sufi influences on Tansen. Late into his life, he continued to compose in Brajbhasha invoking traditional motifs such as Krishna and Shiva.

The presence of musicians like Tansen in Akbar's court was an attempt to accept and integrate the Hindu and Muslim traditions within the Mughal Empire. Tansen became one of the treasured Navaratnas (lit. nava=nine, ratna=jewel) of Akbar's court. He received the honorific title Mian there, and the name Mian Tansen.

Compositions 
Tansen's musical compositions covered many themes, and employed Dhrupad. Most of these were derived from the Hindu Puranas, composed in Braj Bhasha, and written in praise of gods and goddesses such as Ganesha, Saraswati, Surya, Shiva, Vishnu (Narayana and Krishna avatar). He also composed and performed compositions dedicated to eulogizing kings and emperor Akbar.

Family 
Tansen married one Hussaini, having four sons and one daughter by this marriage: Surat Sen, Sarat Sen, Tarang Khan, Bilwas Khan and Saraswati. All five became proficient musicians in their own right, with the latter also marrying Misra Singh of Singhalgarh, a notable veena-player. One legend states that Tansen had also been married to a daughter of Akbar named Mehrunissa.

Death
The year of the death of Tansen, like much of his biography, is unclear. According to one version, written by Islamic historians, Tansen died in 1586 in Delhi, and that Akbar and much of his court attended the funeral procession which was completed according to Muslim customs. Other versions, written by Hindu historians, as well as in Akbarnama, written by Abul Fazl, give 26 April 1589 as the date of his death and that his funeral observed mostly Hindu customs. Tansen remains were buried in the mausoleum complex of his Sufi master Shaikh Muhammad Ghaus in Gwalior. Every year in December, an annual festival, the Tansen Samaroh, is held in Gwalior to celebrate Tansen.

Popular culture
Several Hindi films have been made on Tansen's life, with mostly anecdotal story lines. Some of them are Tansen (1943), a musical hit produced by Ranjit Movietone, starring K. L. Saigal and Khursheed Bano. Tansen (1958) and Sangeet Samrat Tansen (1962). Tansen is also a central character, though remaining mostly in the backdrop, in the historical musical Baiju Bawra (1952), based on the life of his eponymous contemporary.

Legacy

Tansen award

A national music festival known as 'Tansen Samaroh' is held every year in December, near the tomb of Tansen at Behat as a mark of respect to his memory. The Tansen Samman or Tansen award is given away to exponents in Hindustani Classical music.

Buildings
The fort at Fatehpur Sikri is strongly associated with Tansen's tenure at Akbar's court. Near the emperor's chambers, a pond was built on a small island in the middle, where musical performances were given. Today, this tank, called Anup Talao, can be seen near the public audience hall Diwan-i-Aam – a central platform reachable via four footbridges. It is said that Tansen would perform different ragas at different times of day, and the emperor and his select audience would honour him with coins. Tansen's supposed residence is also nearby.

Miracles and legends
The bulk of Tansen's biography as found in the Akbar court historian accounts and gharana literature consists of inconsistent and miraculous legends. Among the legends about Tansen are stories of his bringing down the rains with Raga Megh Malhar and lighting lamps by performing Raga Deepak. Raga Megh Malhar is still in the mainstream repertoire, but raga Deepak is no longer known; three different variants exist in the Bilawal, Poorvi and Khamaj thaats. It is not clear which, if any, corresponds to the Deepak of Tansen's time. Other legends tell of his ability to bring wild animals to listen with attention (or to talk their language). Once, a wild white elephant was captured, but it was fierce and could not be tamed. Finally, Tansen sang to the elephant who calmed down and the emperor was able to ride him.

Crater
A crater on the planet Mercury has been named in Tansen's honor.

References

External links

1490s births
1580s deaths
Indian male classical musicians
Indian Hindus
Mughal nobility
People from Agra
People from Gwalior
People from Rewa, Madhya Pradesh
Akbar
Indian male composers
16th-century Indian musicians